George Wayne (born 1952) is a New York writer who wrote a celebrity Q&A column for Vanity Fair until 2015. He has been called a "celebrity griller" and his work is considered controversial, since he asks blunt and occasionally random and rude questions.

He is the author of a book called Anyone Who's Anyone: The Astonishing Celebrity Interviews, 1987-2017, which features interviews with Ivana Trump, Martha Stewart and Farrah Fawcett. In interview, Wayne says he considers his book a "post-modern treaty on pop culture". He held the celebratory dinner for the book 11 months after its release.

Alongside Andre Leon Talley, he claimed that Vanity Fair treated him unfairly.

References 

Living people
Vanity Fair (magazine) people
1952 births
Jamaican writers
Jamaican journalists
Entertainment journalists
Celebrity biographers